SS Empire Adventure was a 5,787 ton steamship which was built in 1920 as the Eastney. She was sold to France in 1924 and renamed Germaine L D. In 1931 she was sold to Italy, being renamed Andrea, being seized in 1940 and renamed Empire Adventure. She was torpedoed on the night of 20/21 September 1940 and sank whilst under tow on 23 September 1940.

History
Eastney was built by the Northumberland Shipping Co, Howdon, Wallsend, as yard number 356. She was owned and operated by the Romney Steamship Co, London. She was beached at Rammekens for temporary repairs to be carried out. Germaine L D was refloated the next day. Southborough sustained some damage but Germaine L D was undamaged. On 23 March 1932,  she ran aground at Buenos Aires, Argentina, but was freed the next day with assistance from a tug. No damage was sustained. In 1932, Germaine L D was sold to Società Anonima di Navigazione Corrado, Genoa and renamed Andrea. In June 1940, Andrea was seized at Newcastle upon Tyne and renamed Empire Adventure.

Convoy OB 216

Convoy OB 216 departed from Liverpool on 19 September 1940. A total of 21 of the 39 crew were killed. Those lost on Empire Adventure are commemorated at the Tower Hill Memorial, London.

Official number and code letters
Official Numbers were a forerunner to IMO Numbers.

Eastney and Empire Adventure had the UK Official Number 146165 Andrea had the Italian Official Number 1829.

Andrea used the Code Letters NDAT and IBXA. Empire Adventure used the Code Letters GLXW.

References

External links
 Photo of Germaine L D 

1920 ships
Ships built on the River Tyne
Steamships of the United Kingdom
Empire ships
Ministry of War Transport ships
Steamships of France
Merchant ships of France
Maritime incidents in 1929
Steamships of Italy
World War II merchant ships of Italy
Ships sunk by German submarines in World War II
World War II shipwrecks in the Atlantic Ocean
Maritime incidents in September 1940
Shipwrecks of Northern Ireland